Ożarów may refer to the following places:
Ożarów, Łódź Voivodeship (central Poland)
Ożarów, Lublin Voivodeship (east Poland)
Ożarów in Świętokrzyskie Voivodeship (south-central Poland)
Ożarów, Masovian Voivodeship (east-central Poland)